The Head of the UK Delegation to the OSCE is the senior member of the United Kingdom's delegation to the Organization for Security and Co-operation in Europe.

This list includes heads of delegation to the predecessor organisation, the Conference on Security and Co-operation in Europe (CSCE), some of whom were also heads of delegation to the conventional arms control negotiations under the auspices of the CSCE that led to the 1990 Treaty on Conventional Armed Forces in Europe.

The UK Delegation to the OSCE is housed in the British Embassy in Vienna. The head of the delegation usually holds the personal rank of Ambassador.

Heads of Delegation
1980–1982: William Wilberforce
1986–1988: Laurence O'Keeffe
1989–1990: Michael Edes
1990–1992: Paul Lever
1992–1993: Terence Wood
1993–1999: Simon Fuller
1999–2003: John de Fonblanque
2003–2007: Colin Munro
2007–2011: Ian Cliff
2011–2015: Dominic Schroeder
2015–2019: Sian MacLeod

2019–: Neil Bush

References

External links
UK and the OSCE, gov.uk

OSCE
United Kingdom